Capel Coch is a small village in Anglesey, in north-west Wales. Much of the village overlooks Cors Erddreiniog National Nature Reserve. It is in the community of Llanddyfnan.

References

Villages in Anglesey
Llanddyfnan